Caroverine (Spasmium, Tinnitin, Tinnex) is a muscle-relaxing drug used in Austria and Switzerland to relieve spasms in smooth muscles (which include intestines, arteries, and other organs), and the use in those countries was extended to aid with cerebrovascular diseases there, and eventually to treat tinnitus. It is also used to treat tinnitus in India.

Chemically, it is a quinoxalineone and is available in both a base and hydrochloric acid forms.

Pharmacologically, it has been described as a nonspecific calcium channel blocker and as an antagonist of both non-NMDA and NMDA glutamate receptors.

It was discovered in Austria in the 1950s and was developed by Austrian company Phafag AG.

Its INN name, caroverine, was proposed in 1972.

An intravenous formulation was tested in a single-blinded study in tinnitus that published in 1997 and had positive results; an effort to replicate those results failed to show any effect, and more people had their condition worsen than experienced benefit. Pilot studies using a spray formulation for tinnitus published in 2005.

In 2010 Phafag licensed rights to caroverine to the Indian company, Lincoln Pharmaceuticals, to develop the drug for tinnitus in India. Lincoln first marketed it for that purpose in India in 2011.

As of 2016 it had been studied in a small clinical trial in people with loss of the sense of smell.

As of 2018 it was marketed under the brand names Spasmium and Tinnitin in Austria, and under the brand Tinnex in India.

References 

Quinoxalines
Lactams
Phenol ethers
AMPA receptor antagonists
NMDA receptor antagonists
Diethylamino compounds